Julien Boutter and Christophe Rochus were the defending champions but did not compete that year.

Byron Black and Wayne Black won in the final 6–4, 6–3 against Barry Cowan and Mosé Navarra.

Seeds

  Byron Black /  Wayne Black (champions)
  Mahesh Bhupathi /  Leander Paes (semifinals)
  Eyal Ran /  Jairo Velasco, Jr. (quarterfinals)
  Paul Rosner /  Jason Weir-Smith (quarterfinals)

Draw

Qualifying

Seeds

  Tommy Robredo /  Mikhail Youzhny (final round)
  Michal Tabara /  Tomáš Zíb (Qualifiers)

Qualifiers
  Michal Tabara /  Tomáš Zíb

Draw

References
 2001 Gold Flake Open Doubles Draw
 2001 Gold Flake Open Doubles Qualifying Draw

2001 Gold Flake Open
Doubles
Maharashtra Open